Xylouris White is a musical collaboration established in 2013, involving Greek singer and laouto player George Xylouris and Australian drummer Jim White, best known for his work with Dirty Three.  The duo's music has been described as combining "free-jazz, avant-rock and ages-old Greek folk traditions."  To date they have released three albums, and undertaken multiple world tours.

History
The two musicians first met in Melbourne in 1990, when Xylouris was touring with his father, Antonis Xylouris, and became friends.  White first played with Xylouris' family band in Australia in 2009.  They began recording and performing regularly in public together in New York City in late 2013.  They released their first album, Goats, in 2014; it topped the Billboard World Music chart.

They performed together at the Sydney Festival in 2015, in advance of a world tour, and released their second album, Black Peak, on Bella Union, in 2016.

Their third album, Mother, was released early in 2018.

Each of their albums have been produced by Guy Picciotto (Fugazi).

Discography

Albums

Awards and nominations

ARIA Music Awards
The ARIA Music Awards is an annual awards ceremony that recognises excellence, innovation, and achievement across all genres of Australian music. They commenced in 1987.

! 
|-
| 2017
| Black Peak
| Best World Music Album
| 
| rowspan="3"| 
|-
| 2018
| Mother
| Best World Music Album 
| 
|-
| 2020
| The Sisypheans
| Best World Music Album 
|

Music Victoria Awards
The Music Victoria Awards are an annual awards night celebrating Victorian music. They commenced in 2006.

! 
|-
| Music Victoria Awards of 2018
| Xylouris White
| Best Global Act
| 
| 
|-

References

Australian musical duos
Cretan music
Bella Union artists